"Sheep" is a song by English band Pink Floyd, released on the album Animals in 1977. It was originally titled "Raving and Drooling" and performed live on tours in 1974. It was written by bassist Roger Waters.

History
During their tours in 1974, Pink Floyd played three new songs in the first half of the shows, followed by The Dark Side of the Moon in its entirety. The three new songs were "You've Got to Be Crazy" (which later became "Dogs"), "Shine On You Crazy Diamond" and "Raving and Drooling" (which later became "Sheep").

During performances of "Raving and Drooling", a recording of a DJ at BBC Radio called Jimmy Young was played after being cut up and reassembled randomly. This was Roger Waters' idea of a man "raving and drooling" (or being insane). The lyrics of the song at this point were quite different from the ones that were to become "Sheep".

"Raving and Drooling" was originally a more jam-based song. While the basic motif was already in place—a held note from the vocalist (Waters) being crossfaded into the same note on a synthesizer, with various inhuman effects applied—Waters had yet to write anything for the sections repeating F♯7 and A7 (such as "You better watch out! There may be dogs about", and so on), and so these sections, while clearly part of the song structure, were rendered instrumentally. While Gilmour later stated that "Dogs" in its earlier incarnation as "You've Got to Be Crazy" simply had too many words for him to sing, "Raving and Drooling" appeared to suffer more from a lack thereof.

"You've Got to Be Crazy" and "Raving and Drooling" were originally planned to be on the album following the 1974 tours, Wish You Were Here, but plans changed and they ended up in different forms on Animals. In November 2011, versions of both tracks recorded at Wembley in 1974 were officially released as part of the Experience and Immersion versions of the Wish You Were Here album.

In live versions from 1977, backing guitarist Snowy White played bass guitar as Waters shared electric guitar duties with David Gilmour. The performance was almost identical to the album version except that had a slower ending with Richard Wright playing an organ solo.

Ian Peel, a musical columnist for The Guardian, noted the resemblance of "Sheep" to the Doctor Who theme, due to its bassline and sound effects.

Recording
The song was recorded during April, May and July 1976 at the band's own Britannia Row Studios, Islington, London.

Personnel
Roger Waters – lead vocals, rhythm guitar, tape and electronic effects, vocoder
David Gilmour – lead guitar, bass guitar, echoed vocal (from "Dogs")
Richard Wright – Fender Rhodes piano, EMS VCS 3, Minimoog, ARP String Synthesizer, Hammond organ 
Nick Mason – drums, tape effects

References

External links

Pink Floyd songs
1977 songs
British hard rock songs
Protest songs
Songs written by Roger Waters
Song recordings produced by David Gilmour
Song recordings produced by Roger Waters
Song recordings produced by Richard Wright (musician)
Song recordings produced by Nick Mason

it:Animals#Sheep